Gürgan (also, Gürgən and Gyurgyan) is a village in Baku, Azerbaijan. It forms part of the municipality of Gürgən-Pirallahı.

See also
List of lighthouses in Azerbaijan

References

External links
Picture of the lighthouse

Populated places in Baku
Lighthouses in Azerbaijan